Hull RUFC is one of two rugby union clubs based in Hull in the East Riding of Yorkshire, England. They are the current champions of National League 2 North, but will be relegated back after one season in National League 1.

History
The club was formed in 1992 as a result of two clubs – Old Hymerians RUFC and Hull & East Riding RUFC (1989). The club initially played at the Old Hymerians ground at Haworth Park (capacity 1,200) until the 2008–09 season when they moved to their current home; the Ferens Ground located at Chanterlands Avenue.  The club has progressed up the rugby union pyramid, beginning life in the old North East 2, and won promotion to National League 2 North in 2009 –- which at tier 4 is the highest position the club has reached.  In 2009 a women's team was founded and the women and girls section is continuously growing.

In 2015, after six seasons in National League 2 North, Hull were relegated to the northern regional leagues. In 2019 the club won the North Premier (tier 5) league title for the first time, making a return to National League 2 North and in 2022 the club were champions of National League 2 North, winning promotion to the national level of the English club game for the first time.

Ground
The Ferens Ground is next to Hull Sports Centre, on Chanterlands Avenue, about 2.5 miles from Hull Paragon Interchange and the city centre, with parking available both in and around the ground. Capacity is around 1,500, most of which is standing but there is also seating for up to 288.

Honours
 National League 2 North champions: 21–22
 North Premier champions: 2018–19
 North 1 v Midlands 1 promotion play-off winner: 2008–09
 North Division 2 East champions: 2003–04
 Yorkshire 1 champions: 2001–02
 W S Fowler Challenge Trophy Sevens winners: 2005–06
 Yorkshire Cup winners: 2012, 2018

Roll of honour
Presidents
 S. Saunt (1992–95)
 L. J. Sheppard DFC (1995–97)
 R. H. Gore (1997–99)
 A. B. Wilkie (1999–01)
 J. L. Beal (2001–03)
 M. A. Harness (2003–04)
 A. B. Wilkie (2004–05)
 R. C. Lewis (2005–07)
 G. Lound (2007–09)

Chairmen
 R. P. Ashton (1992–94)
 J. L. Beal (1994–96)
 M. A. Harness (1996–98)
 R. C. Lewis (1998–00)
 R. Gibbin (2000–02)
 G. Lound (2002–05)
 A. B. Wilkie (2005–08)

1st XV captains
 D. A. Walters (1992–93)
 W. P. Hazelton (1993–94)
 M. Lockton (1994–96)
 R. L. Beal (1996–97)
 J. M. Oxley (1997–98)
 R. L. Beal (1998–00)
 W. P. Hazelton (2000–01)
 L. McKenzie (2001–03)
 M. David (2003–04)
 G. C. Martinson (2004–05)
 J. D. Barkworth (2005–06)
 C. Kendra (2006–07)
 C. Murphy (2007–08)

Notable players
 Phil Murphy
 Tevita Vaikona
 Motu Tony
 Maea David

Current standings

References

External links
 Hull RUFC

1992 establishments in England
English rugby union teams
Rugby clubs established in 1992
Sport in Kingston upon Hull